Roy Yeager (born February 4, 1949) is an American musician and record producer. 

His musical career started off when he moved to Memphis, Tennessee at the age of 14. Yeager met Bobby Sowell in high school in 1964 and soon they were playing gigs, as a duo and with bands. He drummed with the popular Memphis 1960s groups, The Out Of It's and The Crackerjacks, touring the mid-south and played regularly at the popular Thunderbird Lounge and Roaring 60s in Memphis.

In 1972, he went with Lobo, in 1974 drummed for singer Joe South. His big break came in 1979 when he joined the southern rock group Atlanta Rhythm Section, he toured with them for three and a half years, recording hit records. He moved to Nashville in the 1980s after marrying, became a record producer and bought his own recording studio, Back Street Studio and Rumble Productions. He has done sessions with many rock and country artists including Ronnie Milsap, Dale Hawkins, Alicia Bridges, Paul Davis, Mike Heron, Gail Davis and others.

In 1998, Yeager sold his recording studio and retired, dabbling in real estate and other investments.

He was married to former actress and singer Char Fontane until her death in 2007.

Credits

References

External links
Atlanta Rhythm Section
Bobby Bare
Bobby Sowell
Memphis Bands
Boys From Doraville

1949 births
Living people
American rock percussionists
American rock drummers
Musicians from Memphis, Tennessee
Musicians from Nashville, Tennessee
People from Greenwood, Mississippi
Atlanta Rhythm Section members
Record producers from Mississippi
Record producers from Tennessee